Zvyozdny is a rural locality (a settlement) in Verkhnepogromenskoye Rural Settlement, Sredneakhtubinsky District, Volgograd Oblast, Russia. The population was 245 as of 2010. There are 3 streets.

Geography 
Zvyozdny is located 26 km northeast of Srednyaya Akhtuba (the district's administrative centre) by road. Volzhsky is the nearest rural locality.

References 

Rural localities in Sredneakhtubinsky District